Walnut Township is one of seventeen townships in Adair County, Iowa, USA.  At the 2010 census, its population was 176.

Geography
According to the USGS, it contains four cemeteries: Abandoned Timber, Canby, Oakwood and Saint Josephs.

References

External links
 US-Counties.com
 City-Data.com

Townships in Adair County, Iowa
Townships in Iowa